Sama is a Bantu language of Angola that appears to be closely related to Kimbundu.

References

Languages of Angola
Kimbundu languages